The 1982 Giro d'Italia was the 65th edition of the Giro d'Italia, one of cycling's Grand Tours. The field consisted of 162 riders, and 110 riders finished the race.

By rider

By nationality

References

1982 Giro d'Italia
1982